San Simón de Guerrero is one of 125 municipalities in the State of Mexico in Mexico. The municipality covers an area of 127.42 km².

As of 2005, the municipality had a total population of 5,408.

References

Municipalities of the State of Mexico
Populated places in the State of Mexico